Greg Scott (born June 3, 1988) is a Canadian ice hockey forward currently playing for Brynäs IF of the Swedish Hockey League (SHL). His older brother, Bobby Scott, was drafted by the Toronto Blue Jays in the 2004 First Year Player Draft in the 20th Round.

Playing career 
Undrafted, Scott played major junior hockey with the Seattle Thunderbirds of the Western Hockey League. On July 4, 2008, Scott was signed to a three-year entry level contract with the Toronto Maple Leafs. Throughout his tenure within the Maple Leafs, Scott was assigned to the Toronto Marlies of the American Hockey League. In 270 games in the American Hockey League, Scott was never called up for an NHL game, by the parent club, the Toronto Maple Leafs.

After the conclusion of the 2012–13 season with the Marlies, as an impending free agent with limited interest from NHL teams, Scott was signed to a one-year contract in Sweden with Brynäs IF of the Elitserien on May 29, 2013. He eventually spent three years with Brynäs before heading to Russia following the 2015–16 season, signing with HC CSKA Moscow of the Kontinental Hockey League on May 1, 2016.

In his third season with CSKA in 2018–19, Scott as an Alternate captain, contributed in a depth forward role posting 9 goals and 17 points in 45 regular season games. He recorded 1 goal in 10 playoff games to help CSKA capture their first Gagarin Cup in franchise history.

On June 26, 2019, having left Russia as a free agent, Scott returned to Sweden for a second tenure with Brynäs IF, securing a three-year contract.

Career statistics

Awards and honours

References

External links

1988 births
Living people
Brynäs IF players
Canadian ice hockey centres
HC CSKA Moscow players
Ice hockey people from British Columbia
Reading Royals players
Seattle Thunderbirds players
Toronto Marlies players
Victoria Salsa players
Sportspeople from Victoria, British Columbia
Canadian expatriate ice hockey players in Russia
Canadian expatriate ice hockey players in Sweden